Richard Leland Bare (August 12, 1913 – March 28, 2015) was an American director, producer, and screenwriter of Hollywood movies, television shows and short films.

Career

Born in Turlock, California, he attended USC School of Cinematic Arts where he directed his most notable student film, The Oval Portrait, an adaptation of Edgar Allan Poe's story. He became notable post-graduation for writing and directing the Joe McDoakes series of short films for Warner Brothers between 1942 and 1956, featuring George O'Hanlon in the title role.

On television, he directed seven classic The Twilight Zone episodes: "To Serve Man", "What's in the Box?", "The Fugitive", "Third from the Sun", "The Purple Testament", "Nick of Time" and "The Prime Mover". He directed almost every episode of the 1960s-1970s CBS television series Green Acres. He also directed feature films, including Shoot-Out at Medicine Bend and Wicked, Wicked. On May 2, 2014, he acquired the rights with producer Phillip Goldfine to produce a movie and Broadway play based on Green Acres.

His memoir, Confessions of a Hollywood Director discusses his directorial work, as well as behind-the-scenes information, and his service as a captain in the Army Air Forces' First Motion Picture Unit. Bare also wrote The Film Director: A Practical Guide to Motion Picture and Television Techniques (1971), a text to teach the craft of directing to aspiring filmmakers. On November 19, 2007, Bare announced that he was working on a revival of Green Acres.

He died on March 28, 2015, at the age of 101 at his home in Newport Beach, California.

Filmography

 Two Gun Troubador (1939)
 Smart Girls Don't Talk (1948)
 Flaxy Martin (1949)
 The House Across the Street (1949)
 Return of the Frontiersman (1950)
 This Side of the Law (1950)
 ‘’So You Want To Be A Plumber’’(1951)
 So You Want to Learn to Dance (1953)
 Shoot-Out at Medicine Bend (1957)
 Girl on the Run (1958)
 I Sailed to Tahiti with an All Girl Crew (1968)
 Wicked, Wicked (1973)

References

External links
 
 

1913 births
2015 deaths
American centenarians
Men centenarians
United States Army Air Forces officers
Screenwriters from California
American television directors
Film directors from California
First Motion Picture Unit personnel
People from Modesto, California
People from Turlock, California
USC School of Cinematic Arts alumni
Military personnel from California